Igor Todorović (born 22 November 1970, in Belgrade), known as  Dr Iggy is a Serbian Eurodance musician. He celebrated his birthday with a concert at the Sava Center 1996. Besides "Oči boje duge", his most popular songs are "Nikad", "Kao pre", "Pusti me da živim", "Uzalud se trudiš", "Biću tu", and more.

Discography

Albums 

Dr Iggy released the following albums:
 Oči boje duge (1995)
 Kao pre (1996)
 Kada reči nisu potrebne (1998)
 Zbog tebe (2000)
 Sve (2002)

References

External links 
 Dr Iggy on Myspace
 Dr Iggy on Facebook

1970 births
Singers from Belgrade
Serbian pop singers
Eurodance musicians
Living people